Auriculella perpusilla is a species of tropical air-breathing land snails, terrestrial pulmonate gastropod mollusks. This species is endemic to Hawaii.

References

Auriculella
Molluscs of Hawaii
Gastropods described in 1873
Taxonomy articles created by Polbot